Alexander Semenovich Holevo(also spelled as Kholevo and Cholewo) is a Soviet and Russian mathematician, one of the pioneers of quantum information science.

Biography 
Steklov Mathematical Institute, Moscow, since 1969. He graduated from Moscow Institute of Physics and Technology in 1966, defended a PhD Thesis in 1969 and a Doctor of Science Thesis in 1975. Since 1986 A.S. Holevo is a Professor (Moscow State University and Moscow Institute of Physics and Technology).

Research 
A.S. Holevo made substantial contributions in the mathematical foundations of quantum theory, quantum statistics and quantum information theory. In 1973 he obtained an upper bound for the amount of classical information that can be extracted from an ensemble of quantum states by quantum measurements (this result is known as Holevo's theorem). A.S. Holevo developed the mathematical theory of quantum communication channels, the noncommutative theory of statistical decisions, he proved coding theorems in quantum information theory and revealed the structure of quantum Markov semigroups and measurement processes. A.S. Holevo is the author of about one-hundred and seventy published works, including five monographs.

Honours and awards 
 Andrey Markov Prize of Russian Academy of Sciences (1997)
 Prizes for the best scientific achievements of Russian Academy of Sciences (1992, 1995, 2008)
 Quantum Communication Award (1996)
 Alexander von Humboldt Research Award (1999).
 Invited Speaker of the International Congress of Mathematicians, Madrid (2006)
Claude E. Shannon Award (2016)

Bibliography 

 
 2011 pbk edition

See also
 History of quantum computing
 Werner–Holevo channels

References 

1943 births
Living people
Moscow Institute of Physics and Technology alumni
Academic staff of the Moscow Institute of Physics and Technology
Academic staff of Moscow State University
Quantum information science
20th-century Russian mathematicians
Soviet mathematicians
Quantum information scientists
Academic staff of the Steklov Institute of Mathematics
Information theorists